Derrick White (born July 2, 1994) is an American professional basketball player for the Boston Celtics of the National Basketball Association (NBA). He played three years of college basketball in Division II for the UCCS Mountain Lions before transferring to the Division I Colorado Buffaloes for his final season.

White was drafted 29th overall by the 2017 NBA draft by the San Antonio Spurs. In February 2022, he was traded to the Celtics, with whom he reached the NBA Finals.

High school career
White was the first graduating class of his high school, as it was brand new. As a result, there were no upper classmen on the basketball team when he was a freshman. A 2012 graduate of Legend High School in Parker, Colorado, White was a six-foot combo guard at the time of his graduation. On 2/17/2023 Legend High School retired Derrick White's High School Number

College career
White was lightly recruited out of high school, receiving no scholarship offers from any four-year institutions. At the time of his high school graduation, which fell about two months before his 18th birthday, he was barely 6 feet tall—after growing two inches during his senior year. The only head coach at a four-year school who showed sustained interest in White was Jeff Culver, then the head coach at the Denver campus of Johnson & Wales University, a non-scholarship NAIA member better known for its culinary program. By the time White was preparing to make his college decision, Culver was hired as head coach at NCAA Division II UCCS, and offered White a room and board stipend for his freshman season. Culver was only expecting White to become a starter late in his college career. He was aware that White's father had a late growth spurt in college, and also knew that doctors had projected White to potentially reach 6'5". As it turned out, White reached that potential height by the time he enrolled at Colorado–Colorado Springs. With his newfound size and athleticism, White became a star at UCCS, starting every game of his three-year career and left as the school's career leader in points (1,912) and assists (343). In his junior season, he averaged 25.8 points, 7.3 rebounds and 5.2 assists for the Mountain Lions, leading the team to the 2015 NCAA tournament. He was named an All-American.

Following this season, White opted to transfer to Division I Colorado to play for Tad Boyle and to test his skills in the Pac-12 Conference, one of the top college leagues in the country. After sitting out the 2015–16 season per NCAA rules, White excelled in his lone season with the Buffaloes, averaging 18.1 points, 4.1 rebounds and 4.4 assists per game. He was named first-team All-Pac-12 and a member of the five-man All-Defensive team.

Professional career

San Antonio Spurs (2017–2022)
White was one of 60 NBA prospects invited to the 2017 NBA Draft Combine. He was one of only 15 combine invitees who had not been Rivals top-150 prospects in high school, and one of only three who did not sign with Division I programs out of high school. In addition, according to Yahoo! Sports writer Jeff Eisenberg, he was also "the only one who will use part of his first NBA contract to pay off student loans he accumulated paying for tuition at UCCS as a freshman."

The San Antonio Spurs drafted White with the 29th pick of the 2017 NBA draft. White was later included in the Spurs' 2017 NBA Summer League roster. On July 6, White signed with the Spurs.

On October 18, 2017, White made his NBA debut, coming off the bench in a 107–99 win over the Minnesota Timberwolves. On October 31, 2017, he was sent along with Dāvis Bertāns to the Austin Spurs of the NBA G League. White suffered a fractured right wrist during a G League game against the Texas Legends. He was then recalled to San Antonio several days later. On March 12, 2018, White scored a career-high 14 points along with four rebounds, one assist, and a block in a 93-109 loss to the Houston Rockets.

On April 14, 2018, White made his NBA playoffs debut, coming off the bench with seven points, an assist, a steal, and a block in a 92–113 loss to the Golden State Warriors in game 1 of the series.

On October 12, 2018, White was revealed to have a left plantar fascia tear. On November 7, White made his season debut recording one rebound and three assists in a 95–88 loss to the Miami Heat. On December 31, White scored his career-high 22 points with three rebounds, three assists, two blocks and a steal in a 120–111 win over the Boston Celtics. On January 10, 2019, White scored another career-high 23 points with eight assists, five rebounds, two steals and a block in a double-overtime 154–147 win over the Oklahoma City Thunder. On January 30, 2019 against the Brooklyn Nets, White then recorded a then career-high 26 points. On April 18, 2019 against the Denver Nuggets, White recorded another career-high of 36 points to give San Antonio a 2–1 lead in the first round of the 2019 playoffs.

On December 21, 2020, the Spurs announced that they had signed White to a reported four-year, $73 million rookie scale extension. On April 1, 2021, White hit a career-high 7 three-pointers in a 129–134 double overtime loss to the Atlanta Hawks.

Boston Celtics (2022–present)
On February 10, 2022, White was traded to the Boston Celtics in exchange for Josh Richardson, Romeo Langford, a 2022 first-round pick and the rights to swap 2028 first-round picks. White played his first game with the Celtics a day later and finished with 15 points, 6 rebounds and 2 assists.

In May 2022, during Game 6 of the Eastern Conference Finals against the Miami Heat, White scored 22 points on 7-for-14 shooting, alongside 5 assists and 3 steals, in a 111–103 loss. The Celtics would go on to eliminate the Heat, earning White his first Finals appearance in his career. In Game 1 of the Finals, he logged 21 points and three assists in a 120–108 win over the Golden State Warriors. The Celtics went on to lose the series in 6 games.

On February 13, 2023, White was named Eastern Conference Player of the Week, after averaging 24.5 points, 4.8 rebounds, and 7.5 assists as a starter in place of the injured Marcus Smart.

National team career
On August 24, 2019, White was included in the US national team's final roster for the 2019 FIBA Basketball World Cup.

Career statistics

NBA

Regular season

|-
| style="text-align:left;"|
| style="text-align:left;"|San Antonio
| 17 || 0 || 8.2 || .485 || .615 || .700 || 1.5 || .5 || .2 || .2 || 3.2
|-
| style="text-align:left;"|
| style="text-align:left;"|San Antonio
| 65 || 53 || 25.8 || .476 || .333 || .769 || 3.6 || 5.0 || 1.0 || .7 || 9.9
|-
| style="text-align:left;"|
| style="text-align:left;"|San Antonio
| 68 || 20 || 24.7 || .458 || .366 || .853 || 3.3 || 3.5 || .6 || .9 || 11.3
|-
| style="text-align:left;"|
| style="text-align:left;"|San Antonio
| 36 || 32 || 29.6 || .411 || .346 || .851 || 3.0 || 3.5 || .7 || 1.0 || 15.4
|-
| rowspan=2 style="text-align:left;"|
| style="text-align:left;"|San Antonio
| 49 || 48 || 30.3 || .426 || .314 || .869 || 3.5 || 5.6 || 1.0 || .9 || 14.4
|-
| style="text-align:left;"|Boston
| 26 || 4 || 27.4 || .409 || .306 || .853 || 3.4 || 3.5 || .6 || .6 || 11.0
|- class="sortbottom"
| style="text-align:center;" colspan="2"|Career
| 263 || 159 || 25.9 || .442 || .340 || .838 || 3.3 || 3.8 || .8 || .8 || 11.5

Playoffs

|-
| style="text-align:left;"|2018
| style="text-align:left;"|San Antonio
| 3 || 0 || 6.0 || .500 || .500 || – || .0 || .3 || .3 || .7 || 2.3
|-
| align="left" | 2019
| align="left" | San Antonio
| 7 || 7 || 27.3 || .547 || .294 || .731 || 3.0 || 3.0 || .7 || .7 || 15.1
|-
| align="left" | 2022
| align="left" | Boston
| 23 || 3 || 25.4 || .364 || .313 || .824 || 3.0 || 2.7 || .9 || .6 || 8.5
|- class="sortbottom"
| style="text-align:center;" colspan="2"|Career
| 33 || 10 || 24.1 || .420 || .314 || .792 || 2.8 || 2.5 || .8 || .6 || 9.4

College

|-
| style="text-align:left;"|2012–13
| style="text-align:left;"|Colorado–Colorado Springs
| 24 || 24 || 29.6 || .426 || .342 || .808 || 3.8 || 2.1 || 1.5 || 1.0 || 16.8
|-
| style="text-align:left;"|2013–14
| style="text-align:left;"|Colorado–Colorado Springs 
| 28 || 28 || 30.6 || .480 || .286 || .826 || 6.3 || 4.2 || 1.1 || 1.5 || 22.2
|-
| style="text-align:left;"|2014–15
| style="text-align:left;"|Colorado–Colorado Springs
| 33 || 33 || 32.2 || .529 || .336 || .838 || 7.4 || 5.2 || 2.2 || 2.1 || 25.8
|-
| style="text-align:left;"|2016–17
| style="text-align:left;"|Colorado
| 34 || 32 || 32.8 || .507 || .396 || .813 || 4.1 || 4.4 || 1.2 || 1.4 || 18.1
|- class="sortbottom"
| style="text-align:center;" colspan="2"|Career
| 119 || 117 || 31.5 || .494 || .350 || .824 || 5.4 || 4.1 || 1.5 || 1.5 || 20.9

References

External links

Colorado–Colorado Springs Mountain Lions bio
Colorado Buffaloes bio

1994 births
Living people
21st-century African-American sportspeople
2019 FIBA Basketball World Cup players
African-American basketball players
American men's basketball players
Austin Spurs players
Basketball players from Colorado
Boston Celtics players
Colorado Buffaloes men's basketball players
People from Parker, Colorado
Point guards
San Antonio Spurs draft picks
San Antonio Spurs players
Shooting guards
Sportspeople from the Denver metropolitan area
UCCS Mountain Lions men's basketball players
United States men's national basketball team players